

Christmas is the eleventh overall, sixth North American, and third holiday album released by the a cappella group Rockapella. It was re-released on Shakariki Records in 2004. The album wasn't released in Japan until 2001 on Rentrak Records and has a different track list and different artwork.

Track listings
The US and Japanese editions differ on multiple songs regarding who is given credit. To illustrate this, the writing credits are shown below as they appear on each respective album.

US edition

Japan edition

Personnel
Scott Leonard – high tenor
Kevin Wright – tenor
Elliott Kerman – baritone
Barry Carl – bass
Jeff Thacher – vocal percussion

Special appearances
Natalie Leonard – "The Hope We Hold"

Rockapella albums
2000 Christmas albums
Christmas albums by American artists
A cappella Christmas albums